The Rhythmic Gymnastics Grand Prix is an annual competition of tournaments in rhythmic gymnastics open to athletes from all over the globe. The series consists of a number of stages, culminating in the final event, usually referred to as Grand Prix Final. The Grand Prix circuit usually hosts some of the most watched yearly events in rhythmic gymnastics, frequently gathering some of the best gymnasts in the world. The Grand Prix series should not be confused with the Rhythmic Gymnastics World Cup series, which is a competition officially organized by the Fédération Internationale de Gymnastique (FIG), whereas the Grand Prix is neither organized nor promoted by FIG.

Grand Prix series

The Grand Prix series was established in 1994. The then vice-president of the International Gymnastics Federation, Hans-Jürgen Zacharias, came up with the idea of a series of events held in different cities, and the rules were drafted in the course of many meetings with the European Union of Gymnastics (UEG). The first Grand Prix series was organised in the Netherlands, Ukraine, France, Germany and Austria, with the Grand Prix Final event being held in Innsbruck. The Grand Prix series focuses on individual rhythmic gymnastics; winners of the overall series were crowned for their all-around performances from 1994 to 1997, and later in four apparatus, each year, since 1998 up to the present edition, as of 2019. Grand Prix stages have also hosted a number of rhythmic gymnastics group events, being considered part of the official Grand Prix series. However, even though some Grand Prix Final events had had group events, these were not officially considered part of the Grand Prix Final event, since this event crowns only the overall winners of the individual events.

Grand Prix Final
The final stage of the event, also commonly referred to as Grand Prix Final, was considered a prestigious event in which usually only the best ranked gymnasts from previous stages are allowed to compete. Except for the 1994 edition, in which only the all-around event was staged, in all the other Grand Prix Final tournaments the all-around competitions served as qualifications for the finals by apparatus.

Events

All-time medal table

Successful nations

Individual events
Since 1994, nations which have earned at least one medal on senior level at one of the stages of the Grand Prix series include:

Group events
Organizers of Grand Prix events are also allowed to hold extra events for groups on the same venue. Nations which have earned at least one medal on senior level include:

See also
 List of events at the Rhythmic Gymnastics Grand Prix series
 List of medalists at the Rhythmic Gymnastics Grand Prix Final
 Rhythmic Gymnastics World Cup

References

 
Grand Prix
Sports competition series
Recurring sporting events established in 1994